The Idle Rich is a 1929 American Pre-Code early sound comedy film produced and released by Metro Goldwyn Mayer and directed by William C. deMille. It is based on the Broadway play White Collars by Edith Ellis, which had played at the Egan Theater in Los Angeles in 1924 before moving to the Cort Theatre in New York. The film is extant, and was released DVD in 2012 from WarnerArchive Collection.

This film was remade in 1938 as Rich Man, Poor Girl with Robert Young and Ruth Hussey.

Plot 
Wealthy businessman William "Will" Van Luyn (Conrad Nagel) proposes to his secretary, Joan Thayer (Leila Hyams). She accepts, but worries how her family will react. When he meets them for the first time, little sister Helen (Bessie Love) is delighted by the advantages he will bring, but cousin Henry starts lecturing him on the virtues of the downtrodden middle class. The rich can afford medical treatment, and the poor can rely on the government to pay the bills, but the middle class has to shoulder the financial burden on its own. Nevertheless, Will marries Joan.

A month later, their honeymoon is interrupted when he has to return to the city to deal with a lawsuit. Joan insists that they stay in her family's apartment for a few weeks. Her father (James Neill) turns down Will's offer to buy them a luxurious twelve-room apartment in a much better neighborhood, and the rest of the family supports his decision. Will gamely goes along with Joan's plan, but insists her bedroom is too small for the two of them, and sleeps on the living room couch. This does not contribute to the couple's marital bliss; he has insisted that she quit working, so she does not see much of him during either the day or the night.

Will's good intentions only cause trouble. He secretly arranges for Henry to be offered a good job in South America, but Henry finds out about his hand in it and turns the opportunity down. When Will gives Helen expensive jewelry as a belated birthday present, her fiancé, truck driver Tom Gibney, is furious. He picks a fight, but Will easily knocks him down with a couple of punches.

To teach his in-laws a lesson, Will announces that he is going to become one of them by giving away his fortune to charity. Joan's father has just lost his job, and the entire family admit they have been wrong and try to talk Will out of it. Finally, he reveals that it was all a ploy to get them to realize that his wealth is not something to be ashamed of. They no longer object when he showers them with gifts.

Cast

Reception 

The film received negative reviews.

References

External links 
 
 
 
 
 Lobby poster

1920s business films
1929 romantic comedy films
1929 films
American black-and-white films
American films based on plays
American romantic comedy films
Films directed by William C. deMille
Metro-Goldwyn-Mayer films
1920s American films